Lawrence D. "Spud" Lewis (? – November 29, 1978) was an American football player and coach. He served as the head football coach at the University of San Francisco from 1932 to 1936, compiling a record of 15–21–4. Lewis played college football at Stanford University as a quarterback, halfback, and fullback for head coach Pop Warner. He worked as an assistant football coach at Northwestern University under head coach Dick Hanley for three seasons, from 1929 to 1931, before he was hired at San Francisco in 1932.

Lewis died on November 29, 1978, in San Francisco, following a long illness.

Head coaching record

References

Year of birth missing
1978 deaths
American football fullbacks
American football halfbacks
American football quarterbacks
Northwestern Wildcats football coaches
San Francisco Dons football coaches
Stanford Cardinal football players